The Franklin B. Jenkins House is a historic house at 9 Middle Street in Stoneham, Massachusetts.  The house was listed on the National Register of Historic Places in 1984, at which time its address was listed as 2 Middle Street.  At that time it was noted for its Greek Revival features, including corner pilasters and a front portico which includes pilasters and sidelights flanking the door.  Subsequent residing of the house has obscured or eliminated most of these details (see photo).

The house was built for Franklin B. Jenkins, partner in the shoe manufacturer Jenkins and Vinton.  He later built a more elaborate house (also National Register-listed) on Chestnut Street.

See also
National Register of Historic Places listings in Stoneham, Massachusetts
National Register of Historic Places listings in Middlesex County, Massachusetts

References

Houses on the National Register of Historic Places in Stoneham, Massachusetts
Houses completed in 1860
Houses in Stoneham, Massachusetts